Nine Reasons to Say Goodbye is an album by the rock band A Day in the Life. It was released in 2001 and is the only album by the band under the A Day in the Life name before their name change to Hawthorne Heights. It features their entire original lineup.

It was re-released in 2005 by Carbon Copy Media with a second disc that contains songs by 4 other bands who were signed to Carbon Copy Media, plus two other songs by A Day in the Life.

The album cover is lead vocalist JT Woodruff taking a selfie in a bathroom mirror.

Track listing
 "The Death of a Dream" - 0:48
 "Control Alt Delete" - 2:15
 "Do You Have a Map, Because I'm Lost in Your Eyes" - 3:08
 "The Girl That Destroyed Me" - 2:34
 "Candycanes and Cola" - 3:06
 "Audrey in Sacramento" - 2:41
 "Photograph" - 2:27
 "Until Her Heart Stops" - 2:56
 "I'm Not Crying, My Eyeballs Are Sweating" - 2:35

Re-release track listing

Disc 1
 "The Death of a Dream" - 0:48
 "Control Alt Delete" - 2:15
 "Do You Have a Map, Because I'm Lost in Your Eyes" - 3:08
 "The Girl That Destroyed Me" - 2:34
 "Candycanes and Cola" - 3:06
 "Audrey in Sacramento" - 2:39
 "Photograph" - 2:27
 "Until Her Heart Stops" - 2:56
 "I'm Not Crying, My Eyeballs Are Sweating" - 2:35

Disc 2
 Brighten: "Ready When You Are" - 3:19
 Brighten: "The Better Way" - 3:46
 Ivory: "Don't Go" - 3:19
 Ivory: "Coast of Maine" - 4:03
 Ellison: "Your Goodbyes" - 3:40
 Ellison: "Following You" - 3:36
 Asteria: "Drink Life to the Lees" - 3:09
 Asteria: "A Lesson in Charades" - 3:42
 A Day in the Life: "The Girl That Destroyed Me" - 2:32
 A Day in the Life: "Control Alt Delete" - 2:13

References

A Day in the Life (band) albums
2001 debut albums